Taining County is a county in the northwest of Fujian province, People's Republic of China. It is the northernmost county-level division of the prefecture-level city of Sanming.

Area: .

Population: 130,000.

Postal Code: 354400.

The county government is located in Shancheng town.

The local dialect is a dialect of Gan Chinese, although surrounding areas speak Min Chinese.

Transportation
 Xiangtang–Putian Railway

Climate

Administrative divisions
Towns:
Shancheng, Zhukou, Xiaqu Town

Townships:
Xinqiao Township, Shangqing Township, Datian Township, Meikou Township, Kaishan Township, Dalong Township

Culture
Due to the presence of the Wuyi Mountains, Taining County includes a number of notable parks of various types. One of them, located in the central part of the range, after having been made a World Heritage Site, and qualifying as a UNESCO National Geopark, was certified in 2004 as a UNESCO Global Geopark in the Asia Pacific regional network.

See also
 Wuyishan, Fujian
 Wuyi New Area

References

External links

Official website of Taining County government

 
County-level divisions of Fujian
Sanming